"Hollow Pursuits" is the 21st episode of the third season of the American science fiction television series Star Trek: The Next Generation, and the 69th episode of the series overall. The episode introduces the character Lieutenant Reginald "Reg" Barclay, who would go on to appear frequently in The Next Generation and Star Trek: Voyager, as well as in the film Star Trek: First Contact.

Set in the 24th century, the series follows the adventures of the Starfleet crew of the Federation starship Enterprise-D. In this episode, the Holodeck fantasy life of a highly insecure crewman aboard the Federation starship USS Enterprise-D interferes with his ability to deal with malfunctions which threaten the ship.

Plot
The Enterprise is in the process of transporting Mikulak biological tissue samples intended for use in combating an epidemic of Correllium fever on Nahmi IV. The transport of the samples is delicate, and when they find one of the sample containers is leaking, they are forced to destroy it to prevent the contamination of the other samples. La Forge tells Riker he is concerned that one of his engineers, Reginald Barclay, has been underperforming and notes that he is late to help with the sample transport. What La Forge does not recognise is that Barclay has been in the holodeck acting in a simulation of other Enterprise crew members, avoiding contact with their real counterparts. La Forge requests that Barclay be transferred from the Enterprise but Picard recommends that La Forge take Barclay on as a "pet project".

La Forge works at supporting Barclay as their team works to investigate the failure of unconnected systems around the ship. Picard invites Barclay to a bridge meeting to review the investigation, but slips up and accidentally calls him "Broccoli", a nickname given to him by Wesley Crusher, due to Barclay's tendency to 'veg out'. Barclay later returns to the holodeck to seek refuge in the simulated version of the bridge members. In talking to La Forge, Guinan suggests that Barclay is simply imaginative and that La Forge keep a more open mind towards him. On her advice, La Forge visits Barclay on the holodeck and discovers the exaggerated simulation of the bridge crew. La Forge suggests Barclay has counseling from Troi, whose counterpart on the holodeck displays clear signs of sexual attraction towards Barclay. Barclay attempts to undergo a real counseling session with Troi, but loses control when she tries to relax him with the appearance of actions his holodeck version of her would do, and ends the counseling session to flee back to the holodeck.

When Barclay cannot be located to attend a briefing with Riker, Riker storms into the holodeck with La Forge and Troi to locate him. They find comical versions of the senior staff, with bumbling versions of Picard and La Forge, a slothful idiot version of Wesley Crusher, and an extremely short, comical version of Riker. Riker attempts to stop the program angrily, but Troi stops him saying it might traumatize Barclay and exploring this world can help them understand Barclay better. However, when they come across the sexed up version of her, it's her turn to want to immediately stop the program, but Riker stops her, sarcastically throwing her own words in her face. They finally locate Barclay sleeping in the lap of a fantasy Dr. Crusher.

Suddenly, the Enterprise mysteriously accelerates to warp speeds, and Riker, La Forge and Barclay go to Engineering to discover the matter/anti-matter injectors have jammed; the ship will continue to accelerate until its structural integrity collapses unless the injectors are cleared. The team is unable to come up with any immediate solutions that will work in the limited time they have, but Barclay realizes all the failures they have seen have been connected by a human element: a member of La Forge's Engineering team has been present at each incident, so he surmises that somehow they became carriers of an undetectable contaminant. Using a process of elimination, they reduce the possible contaminants from 15,525 to 2. The contamination that has been interfering with the systems is quickly discovered to be invidium, which was used as part of the Mikulak samples. They are able to quickly repair the injectors, stop the ship, and set course for a nearby starbase to remove the rest of the invidium contamination. La Forge commends Barclay for his contribution in saving the ship.

Barclay returns one more time to the holodeck and addresses the simulated bridge crew, believing it best he leave them, and then deletes all of his holodeck programs but one, program #9.

Production
According to episode writer Sally Caves, Reginald Barclay (Dwight Schultz) is a satirical depiction of Trekkies and their excessive obsession with imaginary characters. Director Cliff Bole disagreed, saying: "I didn't feel that, and I would have heard if it was intended. I certainly didn't approach it that way."

Reception
In 2009, Io9 listed "Hollow Pursuits" as one of the worst of the holodeck themed episodes, although they noted that some people like it. They note that it features Lt. Barclay, who has become addicted to the holodeck and main bridge crew must wean him off his fantasy life.

In 2016, Syfy ranked this the 10th best holodeck episode of the Star Trek franchise.

In 2019, CBR ranked this the fourth best holodeck-themed episode of all Star Trek franchise episodes up to that time.

Releases
The episode was released with Star Trek: The Next Generation season three DVD box set, released in the United States on July 2, 2002. This had 26 episodes of Season 3 on seven discs, with a Dolby Digital 5.1 audio track. It was released in high-definition Blu-ray in the United States on April 30, 2013.

References

 Star Trek The Next Generation DVD set, volume 3, disc 6, selection 1.

External links

 

 Hollow Pursuits rewatch by Keith R.A. DeCandido
 "Hollow Pursuits" rewatch by Zack Handlen of The A.V. Club

Star Trek: The Next Generation (season 3) episodes
1990 American television episodes
Holography in television
Television episodes directed by Cliff Bole